Samuel Martin Burke or S. M. Burke (3 July 1906, Martinpur – 9 October 2010) was a Pakistani diplomat, writer and professor. He was also a member of the Indian Civil Service until 15 August 1947, when he became the only Asian to retire. After Pakistan's independence, he joined the Foreign Service of Pakistan and was appointed as a counselor at the Pakistani High Commission in London. In 1952, he served as a minister in the Pakistani embassy in Washington, D.C. In 1953, he became the first Pakistani Christian head of a diplomatic mission when he was appointed Minister to Sweden, Norway, Finland and Denmark. He also served as chargé d’ affaires in Rio de Janeiro, deputy high commissioner in London, followed by being appointed as Pakistan's ambassador to Thailand, and finally as the High Commissioner to Canada between 1959 and 1961, following which he retired.

Upon retirement he became professor at the University of Minnesota from 1961 to 1975. Burke has authored a number of books covering Pakistan's history and foreign policy.

Personal life
Samuel Burke was born in a Christian family of twelve brothers and sisters in Martinpur, a village in the Punjab Province of British India (now in Pakistan). His sister was the Indian Hindi and Punjabi film actress Chand Burke who appeared in veteran actor Raj Kapoor's award winning film, Boot Polish (1954), where she played the pivotal role of Baby Naaz and Rattan Kumar's tormenting aunt - thus making him the grand uncle of Bollywood actor Ranveer Singh.

Awards
 Sitara-e-Pakistan by President Ayub Khan

Books
 Pakistan's Foreign Policy: An Historical Analysis (1973)
 Mainsprings of Indian and Pakistani Foreign Policy (1974)
 Akbar, the Greatest Mogul (1989)
 Bahadur Shah, the Last Mogul Emperor of India (1995)
 The British Raj in India: An Historical Review (1995)
 Quaid-i-Azam Mohammad Ali Jinnah: His Personality and his Politics (1997)

References

1906 births
2010 deaths
Ambassadors of Pakistan to Thailand
High Commissioners of Pakistan to Canada
Pakistani centenarians
Men centenarians
Pakistani Christians
Pakistani emigrants to the United States
Pakistani expatriates in Brazil
Pakistani expatriates in the United Kingdom
20th-century Pakistani historians
University of Minnesota faculty
Indian Civil Service (British India) officers